Tsoloda is a rural locality (a selo) and the administrative centre of Tsolodinsky Selsoviet, Akhvakhsky District, Republic of Dagestan, Russia. The population was 534 as of 2010.

Geography 
Tsoloda is located 19 km northeast of Karata (the district's administrative centre) by road. Archo is the nearest rural locality.

References 

Rural localities in Akhvakhsky District